Craig Casey (born 19 April 1999) is an Irish rugby union player for United Rugby Championship and European Rugby Champions Cup side Munster. Internationally, Casey made his senior debut for Ireland in 2021. He plays as a scrum-half and represents Shannon in the All-Ireland League.

Early life
Born in Limerick, Casey captained Ardscoil Rís to the semi-finals of the 2017 Munster Schools Rugby Senior Cup, and his performances saw him named in the Munster Schools top XV for 2017, as well as earning representation for Munster and Ireland at under-18 level. He is the nephew of former Shannon and Munster player Mossy Lawler.

Munster
Casey joined the Munster academy ahead of the 2017–18 season, and won the John McCarthy Award for Academy Player of the Year in April 2019. Casey made his senior competitive debut for Munster in their 27–14 win against Connacht in round 21 of the 2018–19 Pro14 on 27 April 2019. Casey had been a late call-up to the bench for Munster after the starting scrum-half, Conor Murray, withdrew during the warm-up and Neil Cronin was promoted to the starting XV. He joined the provinces senior squad ahead of the 2019–20 season on a development contract, before progressing to a full contract ahead of the 2020–21 season.

Casey made his first start for Munster in their 19–14 away win against Connacht in round 8 of the 2019–20 Pro14 on 21 December 2019, and he made his European debut for the province in their 39–22 defeat away to French club Racing 92 in round 5 of the 2019–20 Champions Cup on 12 January 2020. One week later, Casey scored his first try for Munster in their 33–6 win against Welsh side Ospreys, in what was the provinces final pool fixture of the 2019–20 Champions Cup. He signed a two-year contract extension with the province in February 2021. Casey's performances for Munster throughout the 2020–21 season saw him win the clubs Young Player of the Year award. Casey was selected in the 2021–22 United Rugby Championship dream team following his performances for Munster during that season.

Casey signed a three-year contract extension with Munster in September 2022, and earned his 50th cap for the province when he started in their 21–5 home win against Italian side Zebre Parma in round three of the 2022–23 United Rugby Championship on 1 October 2022.

Ireland
Casey had been in contention for selection for Ireland under-20s during 2018, but a series of injuries ruled him out. Having overcome his injury issues, Casey was named as vice-captain in the under-20s squad for the 2019 Six Nations Under 20s Championship, and made three appearances, scoring two tries, during the tournament, which saw Ireland secure a grand slam victory for the first time since 2007. He was retained as vice-captain in the under-20s squad for the 2019 World Rugby Under 20 Championship when it was confirmed in May 2019.

When head coach Andy Farrell announced the Ireland squad for their two remaining 2020 Six Nations Championship fixtures in October, delayed due to the COVID-19 pandemic, Casey was one of six players who, though not being called up to the squad, would train alongside it. Casey earned his first senior international call up in January 2021, when Andy Farrell announced the Ireland squad for the 2021 Six Nations Championship, and he made his senior debut against Italy in round 3 on 27 February 2021, coming on as a replacement for Jamison Gibson-Park in Ireland's 48–10 away win. Ireland captain Johnny Sexton remarked after the game that Casey's attitude reminded him of former England fly-half Jonny Wilkinson.

Casey made his first start for Ireland in their mid-year test against the United States on 10 July 2021, which Ireland won 71–10, and featured off the bench in the 53–7 win against Argentina in Ireland's final fixture of the 2021 Autumn Nations Series on 21 November. Casey's only appearance in the 2022 Six Nations Championship came as a replacement during Ireland's 57–6 home win against Italy on 27 February. Ireland went to claim the Triple Crown after defeating Scotland 26–5 at home in the final round of the tournament on 19 March.

Casey was selected in the squad for the 2022 Ireland rugby union tour of New Zealand, and started in the uncapped match against the Māori All Blacks on 29 June, which ended in a 32–17 defeat for Ireland, and also started in the second uncapped match against the Māori All Blacks on 12 July, which ended in a 30–24 win for Ireland. He captained Ireland A in their 47–19 defeat against an All Blacks XV on 4 November 2022, and featured as a substitute for Ireland during their 35–17 win against Fiji on 12 November and their 13–10 win against Australia on 19 November during the 2022 Autumn Nations Series.

After Jamison Gibson-Park pulled out before kick-off due to injury, Casey was promoted to the bench for Ireland's opening fixture of the 2023 Six Nations Championship against Wales on 4 February, replacing Conor Murray during the second-half of Ireland's 34–10 away win. With Gibson-Park also ruled out of the round two fixture against France on 11 February, Casey retained his place on the bench and replaced Conor Murray during the second-half of Ireland's 32–19 win, before being promoted to the starting XV in Ireland's 34–20 away win against Italy in round three on 25 February. Ireland went on win the grand slam.

Statistics

International analysis by opposition

Correct as of 25 February 2023

Honours

Ireland under-20s
Six Nations Under 20s Championship:
Winner (1): 2019
Grand Slam:
Winner (1): 2019
 Triple Crown:
 Winner (1): 2019

Ireland
 Six Nations Championship:
 Winner (1): 2023
 Grand Slam:
 Winner (1): 2023
 Triple Crown:
 Winner (2): 2022, 2023

Individual
Munster Academy Player of the Year:
Winner (1): 2018–19
Munster Young Player of the Year:
Winner (1): 2020–21
United Rugby Championship dream team:
Selected (1): 2021–22

References

External links
Munster Senior Profile
Munster Academy Profile
Ireland Senior Profile
U20 Six Nations Profile
URC Profile

1999 births
Living people
People educated at Ardscoil Rís, Limerick
Rugby union players from County Limerick
Irish rugby union players
Shannon RFC players
Munster Rugby players
Ireland international rugby union players
Ireland Wolfhounds international rugby union players
Rugby union scrum-halves